Jianying Hu is a Chinese-American computer scientist at the IBM Thomas J. Watson Research Center, Yorktown Heights, NY, USA, known for her work in data mining, machine learning and health informatics. She is an IBM Fellow, Global Science Leader of AI for Healthcare and Director of Healthcare and Life Sciences Research at IBM. She has published over 140 scientific papers and holds more than 40 patents.

Hu studied electrical engineering at Tsinghua University, Beijing, China, from 1984 to 1988 and received a Ph.D. from Stony Brook University, NY, USA, in 1993. She started her career at Bell Labs, Murray Hill, NJ, transferred to Avaya Labs Research in 2000 before joining IBM as a Research Staff Member (RSM) in 2003. She was appointed manager in 2011, senior manager and Principal RSM in 2015, program director and Distinguished RSM in 2016, and IBM Fellow in 2018.

Hu was named Fellow of the International Association for Pattern Recognition in 2010 for contributions to pattern recognition methodologies and applications and service to IAPR, Fellow of the Institute of Electrical and Electronics Engineers (IEEE) in 2015 for contributions to pattern recognition in business and health analytics, and document analysis, Fellow of the International Academy of Health Sciences Informatics (IAHSI) in 2020, and Fellow of the American College of Medical Informatics (ACMI) in 2021. In 2013 she was Asian American Engineer of the Year.

References

External links 
 Hu's IBM homepage
 Hu's publications at DBLP
 
 

Fellow Members of the IEEE
IBM Fellows
Living people
Year of birth missing (living people)
American electrical engineers